Newchurch Halt was a railway station on the former Wigan Junction Railways line between  and .

History
The station opened on 1 February 1943, to serve nearby military establishments: a Royal Ordnance Factory at Risley, and a Royal Navy training camp. A single-track private railway left the Wigan line just to the East of Newchurch Halt, and ran South, across a staffed level crossing at Silver Lane and eventually into the Royal Ordnance Factory.

The station closed on 2 November 1964, when passenger services were withdrawn from the Wigan line.

References

Sources

External links
 The station's history via Disused Stations UK
 Newchurch Halt Station on navigable 1948 O.S. map
 The station and line overlain on many maps in Rail Map Online
 The station and line WJN in Railway Codes

Disused railway stations in Warrington
Former London and North Eastern Railway stations
Railway stations in Great Britain opened in 1943
Railway stations in Great Britain closed in 1964
Beeching closures in England